Richard Peter Witschge (born 20 September 1969) is a Dutch former footballer who played as a midfielder. He was known for his technique and passing ability.

In an 18-year professional career he played mainly for Ajax, but also represented, amongst other clubs, Barcelona. In 11 seasons in the Eredivisie, he amassed totals of 226 matches and 15 goals.

Witschge represented the Netherlands in the 1990 World Cup and Euro 1996.

Club career

Ajax
Witschge was born in Amsterdam, North Holland. A product of local club AFC Ajax's prolific youth ranks under Johan Cruyff, he first appeared in the Eredivisie on 26 October 1986 at the age of 17, and scored his first league goal approximately a year later. His older brother Rob was already playing for the club.

Barcelona
After becoming established in the first team, Witschge signed for Cruyff's FC Barcelona in 1991. The manager later admitted to deliberately overpaying for him, as a favour to Ajax's incoming board of directors headed by his associate Michael van Praag.

Witschge featured sparingly during his tenure, as the Catalans won back-to-back La Liga championships. He made his debut in the competition on 14 September 1991, playing the full 90 minutes in a 3–1 home win against Real Zaragoza. He faced intense competition for playing time as the three allotted slots for foreign players were usually taken up by Michael Laudrup, Hristo Stoichkov and his compatriot Ronald Koeman, and an injury ruled him out of the 1992 European Cup Final.

Bordeaux
Witschge's frustration with this state of affairs at the Camp Nou led him to take a substantial pay cut in joining FC Girondins de Bordeaux for 18 million francs, in 1993. Initially the move was unsuccessful as he was unhappy with his accommodation and clashed with his coaches over their tactics. Amidst ineffectual performances he was booed by his own supporters and eventually dropped from the squad.

Witschge moved to Blackburn Rovers on loan just ahead of the transfer deadline in March 1995, featuring against West Ham United as his team won the Premier League title. He had been intended as a replacement for injured left winger Jason Wilcox, but manager Kenny Dalglish preferred the more conservative option of pushing left-back Graeme Le Saux forward, bringing Jeff Kenna into the defence. An unimpressed Witschge later made an outspoken attack on Blackburn, branding the Lancashire town and its inhabitants "poor and ugly".

Upon his return to Bordeaux, Witschge found conditions under new coach Slavoljub Muslin much more congenial, resulting in a sharp upturn in his form. He scored seven league goals and figured prominently in the team which reached the final of the UEFA Cup, after qualifying for the competition through the 1995 UEFA Intertoto Cup.

Later years
In May 1996, Witschge agreed a return to Ajax, who wanted his experience to bolster the team which had begun to break up in the aftermath of their 1995 European Cup win. In his second spell he played more than 150 matches, helping the club win two leagues and consecutive domestic cups. After falling into dispute with veteran coach Co Adriaanse, who preferred young Rafael van der Vaart in his role, he was loaned to Spanish top-flight side Deportivo Alavés for the 2001–02 season.

After leaving Ajax for a second time in 2003, Witschge had short spells with amateurs ADO '20 in Heemskerk and Oita Trinita in Japan. After a failed trial at Rangers, he retired in June 2004 at nearly 35 years of age.

Witschge returned to the Amsterdam Arena as a youth coach in 2013.

International career
Witschge earned 31 caps for the Netherlands, in which he scored one goal. He made his debut on 21 February 1990 in a 0–0 friendly draw against Italy, and was picked for the 1990 FIFA World Cup under manager Leo Beenhakker.

An injury sustained with Barcelona ruled him out of UEFA Euro 1992 and he did not make another major tournament until Euro 1996, held in England. During this time, his place in the national team was taken by his older brother.

Witschge's initial spell in the national team yielded 19 appearances and one goal, between February 1990 and March 1992. As he subsequently dropped out of contention there was a perception that he had failed to fulfill his early talent, with Beenhakker attributing laziness and immaturity when he bracketed the player alongside contemporaries including Bryan Roy in the 'Patat Generatie', the implication being that they ate junk food instead of focusing on improvement.

After an upturn in his fortunes at club level, Witschge was recalled in September 1995 during the nation's faltering Euro 1996 qualifying campaign. He attended the play-off tie against the Republic of Ireland in Liverpool, but was not ultimately selected. In the finals, he was preferred over Edgar Davids by Guus Hiddink, contributing to his teammate's frustration and eventual expulsion from the squad.

In September 2000, Witschge returned to the national team after a three-year absence, due to an injury crisis. He won his final cap in a 2–2 home draw to Ireland, which dented the Netherlands' qualification prospects for the 2002 World Cup.

Personal life
Witschge's older brother, Rob, was also a footballer and a midfielder.

Career statistics

Club
Source:

International
Source:

Honours
Barcelona
La Liga: 1991–92, 1992–93
European Cup: 1991–92
European Super Cup: 1992

Bordeaux
UEFA Intertoto Cup: 1995

Ajax
Eredivisie: 1997–98
KNVB Cup: 1997–98, 1998–99

References

External links

Stats at Voetbal International 

1969 births
Living people
Dutch footballers
Footballers from Amsterdam
Association football midfielders
Eredivisie players
AFC Ajax players
La Liga players
FC Barcelona players
Deportivo Alavés players
Ligue 1 players
FC Girondins de Bordeaux players
Premier League players
Blackburn Rovers F.C. players
J1 League players
Oita Trinita players
Netherlands international footballers
1990 FIFA World Cup players
UEFA Euro 1996 players
Dutch expatriate footballers
Expatriate footballers in Spain
Expatriate footballers in France
Expatriate footballers in England
Expatriate footballers in Japan
Dutch expatriate sportspeople in Spain
Dutch expatriate sportspeople in France
Dutch expatriate sportspeople in England
Dutch expatriate sportspeople in Japan
AFC Ajax non-playing staff
Association football coaches